Gangohi (Gangohī) is a nisbat or surname derived from the name of the city of Gangoh in India. The Arabic form is al-Kankuhi (al-Kankūhī) or al-Janjuhi (al-Janjūhī).

List of persons with the name
Abdul Quddus Gangohi
Kifayatullah Gangohi
Mahmud Hasan Gangohi
Rashid Ahmad Gangohi

Toponymic surnames
Indian surnames
Urdu-language surnames
People from Saharanpur district
Nisbas